Binghamton is a city in the U.S. state of New York.

Binghamton may also refer to:

Places 
 Binghamton metropolitan area, the region encompassing the city of Binghamton and its suburbs (also known as the Triple Cities)
 Downtown Binghamton
 Binghamton (town), New York, a town neighboring the city
 Binghamton, California
 Binghampton, Memphis, Tennessee, a neighborhood (frequently misspelled "Binghamton")
 Binghamton, Wisconsin, an unincorporated community

Education 
 Binghamton University, a public university in New York state
 Binghamton City School District, a public school district in the state of New York
 Binghamton High School

Sports 
 Binghamton Bearcats, the NCAA Division I athletics program at Binghamton University
 Binghamton Rumble Ponies, an Eastern League baseball team
 Binghamton Devils, an American Hockey League team
 Binghamton Senators, a former American Hockey League team that played from 2002 to 2017

Transportation 
 Binghamton (Delaware, Lackawanna and Western Railroad station)
 Binghamton (ferryboat), a 1905 former ferry and restaurant moored in Edgewater, New Jersey
 Binghamton Electric, a defunct automobile manufacturer
 Greater Binghamton Airport, north of Binghamton, New York

Disasters 
 Binghamton shooting, a 2009 mass shooting in Binghamton, New York
 1913 Binghamton Factory fire, Binghamton, New York

Other 
 Binghamton Zoo at Ross Park, Binghamton, New York
 Captain Binghamton, a character in the 1960s television show McHale's Navy

See also 
 Bingham (disambiguation)
 Binghampton (disambiguation)